The Other Side of the Frontier is a history book published in 1981 by Australian historian Henry Reynolds. It is a study of Aboriginal Australian resistance to the British settlement, or invasion, of Australia from 1788 onwards.

The book constituted the first comprehensive research on this topic, and had a profound impact on Australian historiography. The University of New South Wales Press, which later published the book in 2012, said it "profoundly changed the way in which we understand the history of relations between indigenous Australians and European settlers. It has since become a classic of Australian history." Robert Manne described it as "an important landmark", while Professor Cassandra Pybus of the University of Sydney wrote of the book that "no one could doubt the magnitude of Henry Reynolds' achievement in profoundly changing the way we understand our past".

History and context 
'The Other Side of the Frontier' is about the history of the aboriginals and indigenous people after the commencement of a huge wave of immigration from 1788 on-wards. Aboriginal people encountered cultures which were foreign to them. It was said that 'over 750,000 Aboriginal people inhabited the island continent in 1788'. and through the arrival of settlers, who brought diseases, destroyed the immediate population of many Sydney tribes. For thousands of years before the European invasion, the land was populated by a number of Aboriginal tribes, as colonists led to believe the land was terra nullius. meaning 'no one’s land'. Aborigines lived along the 'foreshores of the harbour' where they ‘fished and hunted the waters and hinterlands of the area, harvested good from the surrounding bush.’[3] They were able to be independent and agreeable and did not need to travel away from their land, as their surroundings had everything they needed. They were able to trade between tribal groups and only moving across the land due to seasonal changes. Without any war between tribes, they were able to live happily, growing their customs, language and culture – 'the heart of which was connection to the land'.

As Lt James Cook arrived in 1770, the Aborigines' ancient way of life came to an end. As his job was to voyage to the Southern Continent and take possession of it - whether it was inhabited or not. He declared the land of New South Wales to be Britain’s King George III’s, disregarding the fact that the land was already inhabited by the indigenous people. The subsequent wave of immigrants failed to understand the Aboriginal way of life, which was to live peacefully with the land and environment, utilising specially honed skills and knowledge which enabled them to use the land to extremely well. These indigenous peoples had a proven sustainability over a huge amount of time - to not overpopulate the land with humans. This was not understood by the British people, and food shortages soon became a problem. The large immigrant population depleted the fish by netting huge catches, reduced the kangaroo population with unsustainable hunting, cleared the land, and polluted the water. As a result, the Aboriginal people throughout the Sydney Basin were soon close to starvation.’[5]

Ben Kiernan, a director of the genocide studies program at Yale University wrote that nineteenth century Australia colonist mounted numerous disciplinary expeditions against the Aborigines in which they committed “hundreds of massacres”[1]. Kiernan claimed that in central Queensland 40% of the indigenous population were killed, and that the Aborigines “were hunted like wild beasts, having lives for years in a state of absolute terror of white predators”. However, many of these claims remain unproven.[2]
[1] “The Fabrication of Aboriginal History.”

[2] “The Fabrication of Aboriginal History.”

Author 
Henry Reynolds, born 1938 grew up in Hobart and attended Hobart High School and then went to university at the University of Tasmania attaining a Master's degree. He married Margaret Lyne in 1963 who later became a senator for Queensland in Federal Parliament. He quickly grew interested in the relations between settlers and Aborigines after accepting a lectureship at James Cook University in Townsville in 1965. The Other side of the Frontier was one his most ‘pioneering scholarly work(s) (and) was critical in changing understandings of the Australian frontier’[1] Reynolds was highly successful in both writing and teaching as he ‘taught in secondary schools in Australia and England and joined the staff of Townsville University College (later James Cook University) in 1966.’[2] He also was an associate professor of History and Politics at the University from 1982 until he later retired in 1998. As well as writing over 10 books, he has written a number of chapters in books, as well as articles, book reviews and conference and seminar papers.

Books

Aborigines and settlers (1972)

The Other side of the Frontier (1981)

The law of the land (1987)

Frontier; Aborigines, settlers and land (1987)

Dispossession; Black Australia and white invaders (1989)

With the white people (1990)

Fate of a free people (1995)

Aboriginal sovereignty (1996)

This Whispering in our hearts (1998)

An indelible stain?; the question of genocide in Australia’s history (2001)
[1] “Henry Reynolds.”

[2] “Papers of Henry Reynolds.”

Overview 
The most notable theme of the non-fiction book is the analysis of Aboriginal resistance to Westerns at the time of the European settlement in Australia, which makes about a third of “The Other Side of the Frontier”.  Reynolds gives a summary of Indigenous communities'’ first reactions to European settlers arriving in Australia. He examines the gradual transition of Indigenous communities' perception of European settlers, and the formation of areas of physical conflict. Reynolds analyses the transition from the initial curiosity Indigenous people had towards European settlers to war like resistance. According to historian L. Ryan the "Other side of the Frontier” is structured around three main themes: “a strong internationalism drawn from the United Nations Charter on Human Rights; that the ghost of racism underlies modern Australia; and indigenous issues and justice should be at the center of public debate  

The book recounts summaries of conditions in different areas of Indigenous life affected by colonial settlement. The first chapters include the most important accounts of Indigenous people’s reactions to European pastoral, urban, agriculture and missionary activities. These significant activities, make up the structure of Reynolds arguments regarding Aboriginal resistance to European settlement in Australia. 

In following a loose chronological order, Reynolds revisits these key interactions between Indigenous people and European settlers, through which he provides evidence of Aboriginal resistance. To document this, Reynolds draws upon archival information on the language developed by Indigenous people to address European settlers and their activities, highlighting the gradual transition from a use of Aboriginal words to newly invaded terms indicative of the fear and resistance.

The book also covers new Aboriginal tools, strategies and resources that were part of Aboriginal reaction to European settlement.  Reynolds argues that there was not one homogenous Aboriginal response to European settlement. The book covers Indigenous resistance in different parts of Australia and Tasmania highlighting the most significant differences and similarities amongst them.

Editions 
“The Other Side of the Frontier” was first published by James Cook university in 1981  This publication has been criticized for not having any illustrations and footnotes index.  Critics have also been made on the failure of widely distributing the book and making it readily available to the public, by failing to meet shipment the shipment criteria of public retailers.  In 1982, Penguin published the second edition of the book, with an edited introduction and different subheadings.

Adaptations and Popular Culture 
There are no film, theatre or documentary adaptations of “The Other Side of the Frontier”. However, several documentaries and series have relied heavily on the book. The ABC television series “Frontier”, a three-part series on the development of European policy regarding Aboriginal people from mid 1780s to 1930s, draws heavily upon the historical facts Reynold’s present in his book.  The 2012 docudrama film Mabo and a BBC documentary on the history of race, also drew historical evidence and narrative from this book.  The 2008 seven-parts SBS historical series on Australia history through the eyes of First Nation’s people, named First Australians, was also heavily based on the facts presented in Reynolds’ “The Other side of the frontier war”.

Reception 
Reynold’s “The Other side of the Frontier” has been broadcast to the general public of Australia, since its first publication in 1981. The book’s accessible language and price makes it attainable to the general public.  “The Other Side of the Frontier” has also circulated in academic circles in seminars and talks given by Reynolds at universities, like Special History 2008 seminar in University of Queensland (and his history lectures in Townsville University College till 1982). 

His book has also been recognized by leading Australian historian like Lyndall Ryans who has stated that “In representing the Aborigines as displaced and dispossessed, he turned Australian history inside out rather than upside down. Reynolds was the first Australian historian to challenge the belief that the Aborigines had no political rights”.  

In addition, Reynolds has played a central role in the History Wars.  History Wars is an ongoing debate amongst lead historians like Reynolds and Windschuttle, regarding the existence of a genocide during European settlement in Australia.  “The Other side of the Frontier” is also included in the History Extension curriculum of Australian high schools. Reynolds’ arguments regarding the Aboriginal resistance of European settlement in Australia, as well as the massacres of First Nation’s people has come with sharp controversy.  

In 1982, the book was awarded the Ernest Scott Historical Prize.

Favourable   
Reynolds is praised for discussing Aboriginal resistance and “shuttering the myth that Aboriginal people didn’t fight for their land”.   According to Australian historian and scholar, McQueen, Reynold’s account of Aboriginal resistance to European settlement is a key counterpoint to the legal justification of Indigenous stolen land and rights.  Through the lens of European settlers, it is argued that the lack of indigenous protection of their lands, furthers justifies European ownership. 

The book has also been praised for Reynolds’ historic methodology, with scholars like McQueen arguing that Reynolds achieved “the impossible” by documenting the response of pre-literature people.  This was achieved mostly through a deep research of available historical archives as well as close contact with Indigenous communities and over ten years of research.  Reynolds’ supporters who generally share left-liberal views considered Reynolds a pioneer of Australian revisionist history for having attempted to relate history from an Indigenous perspective.  Scholar Gray, states that this sets the “Other Side of the Frontier” apart from most historical books concerned with European settlement, which are in majority written from a colonial point of view.    

Barrier Dyster praises the book, stating that “No Australian course, no Australian student, no Australian home should be without a copy”. 

Reviewing it for the Aboriginal Law Bulletin, John Terry wrote:Reynolds' book presents important concepts in Australian history. It is an appreciation that the convicts, squatters, explorers, diggers, ticket-of-leave men and the like did not step onto a continent that was barren and uninhabited, but into a rich and complex world of another people who resisted the invasion, fought for their land, struggled to survive - and who continue to struggle for due recognition. These ideas have been familiar for some time of course, and attempts have been made to document them, but this is the first serious production by a competent historian.

Negative 
“The Other Side of the Frontier” has received strong criticism about the historical alternative it offers. Windschuttle, the other main historian in the center of the History Wars, disagrees that there ever was an Aboriginal frontier war, arguing that Reynolds had fabricated the evidences that he uses in his book.  Other historical and political figures, like R. Firth and J. Howard share a similar view with Windschuttle.  This criticism is based mostly on different historical methodologies that are used to collect data supporting or disproving of the existence of a Frontier War, mostly in regards to which sources are deemed reliable in their records of Indigenous people death toll. 

The “Other Side of the Frontier” has also been criticized about the socio-political aftermath of the book. Nick Minchin, former Australian federal senator, condemns “The Other Side of the Frontier” arguing that the book makes reconciliation “even harder to achieve”, by discussing the genocide and hardship Indigenous communities' experiences during European settlement, which stands responsible for Indigenous peoples’ generational trauma today.  

This fits into a wider narrative of criticism against Reynolds and his work, targeting his particularly dark and bloody presentation of Australian history. It is for these reasons that the book has been characterized as unpatriotic by Windschuttle and other conservatives.

History Wars 
The main negative critic against “The Other side of the Frontier” comes from Australian historian Windschuttle within the context of the ongoing History Wars. The debate between Windschuttle and Reynolds, discusses the existence of the Indigenous resistance during European settlement. Winschuttle's’ disputes the existence of any organised Indigenous front against European settlers, while Reynolds argues the opposite.  

Windschuttle has extensively spoken and written in response to “The Other side of the Frontier” rejecting Reynold’s arguments and questioning his methodology. He has argued that Reynolds has misinterpreted or misunderstood the original sources in his book, resulting in inaccurate claims (Windschuttle, 2009). Windschuttle notes that the original sources Reynolds has used (which he doesn’t reveal), have admitted guessing the death toll of Indigenous people with no clear knowledge of the actual numbers 

In addition, Windschuttle also argues that Reynolds exaggerates the death toll of Indigenous people in his book, in order to support his claims about European settlement in Australia. Reynolds, as Windschuttle argues, achieves this by deliberately taking out of context historical sources, like British settlers’ ones, to support his claims on Australian history (139). In regards to Reynold’s methodology of recording Indigenous people's death toll during European settlement, Windschuttle notes: 

“When he [H. Reynolds] came to write The Other Side of the Frontier, Reynolds decided to combine the figure of 800 to 850 white deaths with his footnoted guess that the ratio of black deaths to those of whites "may have been" ten to one. So he multiplied 800 to 850 by ten. This is the origin of the book's claim of 8000 to 10,000 Aboriginal deaths, and is the sole reference from which this total has been compiled. Even on his own arithmetic, of course, the figure should have been 8000 to 8500 deaths, but Reynolds obviously has no qualms about plucking another 1500 bodies out of the air to make the total look even bigger.”  

[1] “A Brief Aboriginal History.”

[2] “A Brief Aboriginal History.”

[3] “A Brief Aboriginal History.”

[4] “A Brief Aboriginal History.”

[5] “A Brief Aboriginal History.”

References

External links
 Internet Archive "The Other Side of the Frontier"



Books about Australian history
Books about the Australian frontier wars
1981 non-fiction books
Books about Indigenous Australians
Historiography of Australia
Australian non-fiction books